Saputo Stadium is a soccer-specific stadium at Olympic Park in the borough of Mercier–Hochelaga-Maisonneuve in  Montreal, Quebec, Canada. The stadium opened on May 21, 2008, and is the current home of CF Montréal (formerly the Montreal Impact). The stadium is built on the former practice track and field site on the grounds of the 1976 Summer Olympics, while the stadium's east side has a view of Olympic Stadium's inclined tower. It has a capacity of 19,619, making it the second-largest soccer-specific stadium in Canada, after BMO Field in Toronto.

Construction
The stadium cost  ($ in  dollars) to build, with $7.5 million paid by the Saputo family and the rest financed on a 25-year term. Saputo Stadium is now CF Montréal's administrative headquarters and also includes a training field, 34 corporate suites and full player welfare areas. It was designed and fabricated by Dant Clayton Corporation and built by Broccolini Construction Inc.

The stadium features a natural grass playing surface and was reportedly preferred over BMO Field and its then-artificial turf by members of the Canada men's national soccer team. BMO Field has since installed a heated and irrigated hybrid (mixed artificial and natural grass) field.

Anticipating a Montreal entry into Major League Soccer, plans were made to expand the stadium from its initial 13,034 capacity to 20,000 to cope with the anticipated boost in attendance. The Quebec government put $23 million for the renovation and expansion of the stadium (the total cost of the stadium was therefore about $40 million). The construction plans went into effect after MLS granted Montreal their nineteenth franchise, which began play in the 2012 season.

Sports usage
The stadium welcomed its first Impact home game on May 19, 2008, a scoreless draw against the Vancouver Whitecaps. The Impact's first goal in the stadium was scored by Rocco Placentino against the Charleston Battery on June 13, 2008. This also gave the Impact its first victory in the stadium, with a score of 1–0. The Impact's first game in the newly renovated and expanded Saputo was played on June 16, 2012, against the Seattle Sounders FC. The Impact won the game 4–1.

The only official international matches played at Saputo Stadium were two matches played by Canada men's national soccer team during the 2010 FIFA World Cup qualification (CONCACAF).

Gallery

See also
 List of soccer stadiums in Canada
 List of Major League Soccer stadiums
 List of Canadian Premier League stadiums

References

External links

Stadesaputo.com

North American Soccer League stadiums
Major League Soccer stadiums
CF Montréal
Soccer venues in Montreal
Sports venues in Montreal
Mercier–Hochelaga-Maisonneuve
2008 establishments in Quebec
Sports venues completed in 2008